French materialism is the name given to a handful of French 18th-century philosophers during the Age of Enlightenment, many of them clustered around the salon of Baron d'Holbach.  Although there are important differences between them, all of them were materialists who believed that the world was made up of a single substance, matter, the motions and properties of which could be used to explain all phenomena.  

Prominent French materialists of the 18th century include:

 Julien Offray de La Mettrie
 Denis Diderot
 Baron d'Holbach
 Claude Adrien Helvétius
 Pierre Jean Georges Cabanis
 Jacques-André Naigeon

See also
 German materialism
 Mechanism (philosophy)
 Metaphysical naturalism

External links
 Marx's essay on French Materialism on WikiSource

Materialism
Philosophical schools and traditions
French philosophy